Gulzar is town and union council of Dera Bugti District in the Balochistan province of Pakistan. It is located at 30°31'30N 69°1'50E and has an altitude of 1292 metres (4242 feet).

References

Populated places in Dera Bugti District
Union councils of Balochistan, Pakistan